SSTH may refer to:

 Swiss School of Tourism and Hospitality
 Super slender twin hull, see SSTH Ocean Arrow
 Semantic script theory of humour